22 is the eighth studio album by British singer Craig David. It was released on 30 September 2022 through TS5 Label and Moor Records.

Critical reception

Kyann-Sian Williams of NME called 22 a "nostalgia-loving [...] silky R&B revival record". She wrote that "heavily relying on the feel-good nature of classic '00s R&B, Craig David could have dangerously made a gimmicky throwback album. Yet, in a time when many UK R&B fans are crying out for great music and recognition, Craig David not only feeds that appetite but uses his platform to laud up some stars to watch too." Kate French-Morris, writing for The Telegraph, remarked that the album "isn't addled by trends, unlike its 2018 predecessor, which caught David toying with autotune and EDM drops [...] A fresh generation of ears have given him a fairer hearing and comeback success. 22 is no Born to Do It, but it at least reminds us of that album’s deserved prestige."

Chart performance
22 debuted at number seven on the UK Albums Chart. This marked David's sixth album to enter the top ten album. Elsewhere in the UK, the album also debuted and peaked at number one on the Independent Albums Chart, while also reaching number 2 on the UK Album Downloads, and number 4 on both the Physical Albums, and the Albums Sales Chart. 22 also debuted at number 25 on the Scottish Albums Chart.

Track listing

Notes
  signifies an additional producer
Sample credits
 "Who You Are" samples the song "All My Life" as performed by K-Ci & JoJo and written by JoJo Bailey and Rory Bennett.
 "Best of Me" samples the song "Heartbreaker" as performed by Mariah Carey and Jay-Z and written by Mariah Carey, Jeffrey Cohen, Shawn Carter, Shirley Ellis, Lincoln Chase and Narada Michael Walden.

Charts

Release history

References

2022 albums
BMG Rights Management albums
Craig David albums